Sulforidazine (Imagotan, Psychoson, Inofal) a typical antipsychotic and a metabolite of thioridazine; it and mesoridazine are more potent than the parent compound, whose pharmacological effects are believed by some to be largely due to its metabolism into sulforidazine and mesoridazine.

Synthesis

2-bromo-2'-amino-4'-methylsulphonyl-diphenyl Sulphide, CID:43448246 (1)
2-bromo-2'-acetamino-4'-methylsulphonyl diphenylsulphide (2)
2-(2-Chloroethyl)-1-Methylpiperidine [50846-01-0] (3)

References 

Abandoned drugs
Typical antipsychotics
Phenothiazines
Piperidines
Tertiary amines